Duperré Bay is a bay  long, lying immediately northeast of Hulot Peninsula at the southwest extremity of Brabant Island, in the Palmer Archipelago. It was discovered by the French Antarctic Expedition, 1903–05, under Jean-Baptiste Charcot, who named it for Vice Admiral Charles Duperré of the French Navy.

Maps
 Antarctic Digital Database (ADD). Scale 1:250000 topographic map of Antarctica. Scientific Committee on Antarctic Research (SCAR). Since 1993, regularly upgraded and updated.
British Antarctic Territory. Scale 1:200000 topographic map. DOS 610 Series, Sheet W 64 62. Directorate of Overseas Surveys, Tolworth, UK, 1980.
Brabant Island to Argentine Islands. Scale 1:250000 topographic map. British Antarctic Survey, 2008.

References 

Bays of the Palmer Archipelago